A packet-switching node is a node in a packet-switching network that contains data switches and equipment for controlling, formatting, transmitting, routing, and receiving data packets.  

Note:  In the Defense Data Network (DDN), a packet-switching node is usually configured to support up to thirty-two X.25 56 kbit/s host connections, as many as six 56 kbit/s interswitch trunk (IST) lines to other packet-switching nodes, and at least one Terminal Access Controller (TAC).

Packets (information technology)